Thomas Kotlár (born 5 August 2003) is a Slovak footballer who plays for Spartak Trnava as a forward.

Club career
Kotlár made his professional Fortuna Liga debut for Spartak Trnava against ŠK Slovan Bratislava on 11 July 2020.

References

External links
 FC Spartak Trnava official club profile 
 Futbalnet profile 
 
 

2003 births
Living people
Slovak footballers
Association football forwards
FC Spartak Trnava players
Slovak Super Liga players